The Gaisal train disaster occurred on 2 August 1999, when two trains carrying about 2,500 people collided at the remote station of Gaisal in West Bengal. Owing to a signalling error, both trains were using the same track on a day when three of the four tracks on the line were closed for maintenance. Their combined speeds were so great that the trains exploded on impact, killing at least 290 people.

Collision
The crash occurred at about 1:45a.m. on 2August, 1999, when the Avadh Assam Express from New Delhi collided with the Brahmaputra mail at Gaisal railway station, Uttar Dinajpur, West Bengal, 19 kilometers from Kishanganj. Through a signaling error at Kishanganj, the Avadh Assam Express from Delhi was transferred onto the same track as the mail train. No one on either train or in the signals and station master's office noticed the error. The staff at intermediate stations between Kishanganj and Gaisal also failed to notice that the Assam express was on the wrong track. As a result, Brahmaputra Mail train crashed headlong into the front of the Avadh Assam Express at Gaisal. The Avadh Assam Express WDM-2 locomotive was thrown high in the air, and passengers from both trains were propelled into the neighbouring buildings and fields by the force of the explosion.

Failures
Three of the four lines at Kishanganj station were non-operational because a doubling of lines was in progress. Only one line was being used to carry the load usually carried by four: 31 trains per day. Track circuiting and interlocking were also not correctly functioning at the station, because of the work in progress. Track circuiting is an electrical procedure by which the station master, and consequently the train driver, can know that the track ahead is occupied. The signals will remain red, interlocking the track, which effectively means that the series of signals cannot be turned green unless the station master allows. The signals can be changed from the relay room which can only be opened jointly by the station master and the signal inspector. In such a situation, the points in the track have to be set manually by a "cranking" procedure, whereby a crank handle, available at stations, is rotated manually on the orders of the station master for setting the points, which are then clamped and locked. The entire process takes around 30 minutes.

The driver B.N. Roy who was heading Avadh Assam Express had already moved the train to downline and on the same track, BC Bardhan heading Delhi bound Brahmaputra Mail was coming. The cause of disaster was duty negligence made by ASM of Kishanganj Railway Station as due to setting wrong points manually on the track by track men, Avadh Assam Express shifted to downline which should have been upline otherwise. At the same time, information was passed to the next station that Avadh Assam Express had been sent to upline from Kishanganj station which was incorrect from the fact that Avadh Assam Express was running on downline track. The convergence point of two trains was at Gaisal Railway station (near to Kishanganj) where both trains collided.

According to the witnesses, engine of Avadh Assam express jumped several feet high and engine of Brahmaputra Mail rammed into several coaches of Avadh Assam Express resulting in one of the deadliest disasters of the Indian Railways.

If perhaps the driver of Avadh Assam Express had seen the signal lights by peeping outside from his seat, he could have averted the disaster as on his line, all signals were pointing opposite side green instead of usual front facing green signals. That opposite side green signal was for the driver BC Wardhan of Delhi bound Brahmaputra Mail. Moreover, if station cabin of Kishanganj Railway station could have checked the green signal of upline not turned to red which was supposed to be red in case Avadh Assam Express would have touched upline, this disaster could have been averted. Whenever any train crosses the Advance Starter point of railway station, green signal is turned to red either manually or automatically and again becomes green after train crosses nearby one or two stations.

Since Avadh Assam express had not touched the upline, green signals on upline were lighting up green and had not turned red. If perhaps this had been noticed by cabin staff of Kishanganj Railway station on time, trains could have been stopped before Gaisal and this disaster could have been averted.

Assistant Station Master (ASM) of Kishanganj station, S P Chandra, later admitted to sending the Avadh Assam Express on the wrong (down) line, causing it to collide with the Brahmaputra Mail on August 1, first presented by a preliminary inquiry report of Chief Commissioner of Railway Safety (CCRS). Immediately after the incident Chandra absconded and was arrested in Katihar on August 10.

Emergency services
The line was blocked by wreckage, and the Gaisal emergency services were utterly overwhelmed, as fire swept through the ruined vehicles and station buildings, killing many of the injured people trapped in the trains. Many vehicles and aid support services had to undertake the 14-hour drive from Calcutta to reach the site, by which time many of those they could have helped were already dead. Those who were picked up by rescuers were taken to hospitals in Kishanganj and Islampur, which were also overwhelmed by the scale of the disaster.

Heavy rains helped dampen fires the following day, and rescue workers began trying to separate the twelve mangled carriages of the train and identify the bodies contained inside. Many were unrecognizable and never identified. Many bodies were not even found.

Death toll
The official death toll released was set at 285 killed and over 300 injured in the crash. Unofficial totals have claimed that over 1000 or even more were killed, including 90 soldiers. This is possible because although there were only 72 seats in each of the seven general compartments that were involved in the accident, all of them were crowded far beyond capacity. Moreover, there were many ticketless travelers who were not included in the official count. Because of the nature of the crash and fire, as well as the large number of ticketless people who may have been on the trains, the bodies could not be separately identified. There has also been speculation that explosives carried on the military train may have been the cause of the explosion following the impact, rather than the trains themselves. This has been denied by the Indian military, but has remained a controversial issue.

Railway Minister Nitish Kumar resigned on moral grounds, only second railway minister to do so, after Lal Bahadur Shastri.

Other Indian rail disasters
This was the worst Indian rail disaster since the Firozabad rail disaster in 1995, and is comparable to the Bihar train disaster of 1981, in which as many as 800 people were reported to have died.

References

External links

http://www.rediff.com/news/1999/aug/03rail3.htm
https://web.archive.org/web/20131217221449/http://www.financialexpress.com/old/ie/daily/19990814/ige14049.html
https://web.archive.org/web/20130726151415/http://archives.digitaltoday.in/indiatoday/19990816/nation2.html

1999 in India
Explosions in 1999
Railway accidents in 1999
August 1999 events in Asia
1990s in Assam
1990s in West Bengal
Railway accidents and incidents in Bihar
Disasters in Assam
Disasters in West Bengal
Train collisions in India
Uttar Dinajpur district
1999 disasters in India